(-)-Isopiperitenone reductase is an enzyme with systematic name (+)-cis-isopulegone:NADP+ oxidoreductase. It catalyses the following chemical reaction:

 (+)-cis-isopulegone + NADP+  (-)-isopiperitenone + NADPH + H+

The reaction occurs in the opposite direction.

References

External links 
 

EC 1.3.1